Abba Thulle was the ibedul,  of Koror whom the sailor Henry Wilson and his crew met on their voyage to Palau in 1783. His second son Prince Lee Boo became one of the first people from the Pacific Islands to visit Great Britain, but died six months after he departed. He learned of his son's death when Captain John McCluer later visited the islands.  Andrew Cheyne wrote about his encounter with Abba Thulle in the book A description of islands in the western Pacific ocean, north and south of the equator. William Lisle Bowles wrote a poem about him entitled Abba Thule's Lament For His Son Prince Le Boo. A horse was named after him that later won the Doncaster Cup in 1790.

Notes

References

History of Palau
People from Koror
Ibeduls of Koror